Winterborn is a municipality in the Donnersbergkreis district, in Rhineland-Palatinate, Germany. It can also refer to:

 Winterborn (band), a Finnish band
 Winterborn (film), a 1978 Danish film
 Winterborn (This Sacrifice) (song), a song by The Crüxshadows on their "Ethernaut" album

See also
 Winterborne (disambiguation)